Vespomima is a genus of picture-winged flies in the family Ulidiidae.

Species
 V. nigrotaenia

References

Ulidiidae